Vedat Karakuş (born 28 February 1998) is a Turkish professional footballer who plays as a goalkeeper for Adana Demirspor.

Professional career
Karakuş is a youth product of Lüleburgazspor, and signed his first professional contract with Kayserispor in 2016. made his professional debut for Kayserispor in a 5-0 Süper Lig loss to Fenerbahçe on 2 April 2018. He had a stint with Modafen in the TFF Third League in 2019. He transferred to Adana Demirspor in the TFF First League in January 2020 where he mainly acted as backup goalkeeper, and helped them get promoted into the Süper Lig for the 2021-22 season.

Honours
Adana Demirspor
TFF First League: 2020–21

References

External links
 
 
 

1998 births
Living people
Sportspeople from Şanlıurfa
Turkish footballers
Kayserispor footballers
Süper Lig players
TFF First League players
TFF Third League players
Association football goalkeepers